The New York 1927 chess tournament was an elite chess tournament held in New York City from February 19 to March 23, 1927. Play was held in the magnificent surroundings of the Trade Banquet Hall of the Hotel, Manhattan Square. Julius Finn was the president of the event. The prizes were on a lavish scale: $2,000 for the winner, $1,500 for second place, and $1,000 for third place. Non-prize-winners received $50 for each game won and $25 for each draw.

Capablanca was in superb form and won easily. He also won the $125 First Brilliancy Prize. Alekhine finished second. Later that year, the two played a match for the World Championship, in which Alekhine defeated Capablanca (see World Chess Championship 1927).

The event was a quadruple round-robin tournament.  The results and standings are:

{|class="wikitable" style="text-align: left;"
! # !! Player !! 1 !! 2 !! 3 !! 4 !! 5 !! 6 !! Total
|-
|1 ||   ||**** ||1½½½ ||1½1½ ||½½1½ ||½½1½ ||11½1 || 14
|-
|2 ||   ||0½½½ ||**** ||½01½ ||½½½½ ||1½½1 ||½1½1 || 11½
|-
|3 ||   ||0½0½ ||½10½ ||**** ||½100 ||½1½1 ||½11½ || 10½
|-
|4 ||   ||½½0½ ||½½½½ ||½011 ||**** ||½½½½ ||½½10 || 10
|-
|5 ||   ||½½0½ ||0½½0 ||½0½0 ||½½½½ ||**** ||½½1½ || 8
|-
|6 ||   ||00½0 ||½0½0 ||½00½ ||½½01 ||½½0½ ||**** || 6
|}

Literature
Alekhine, Alexander: International Chess Tournament New York 1927, Dallas, Chess Digest 1972

References

Chess competitions
Chess in the United States
1927 in chess
1927 in sports in New York City
1920s in Manhattan
Sports competitions in New York City
March 1927 sports events
February 1927 sports events